This article contains information about the literary events and publications of 1983.

Events
April – The Russian samizdat poet Irina Ratushinskaya is sentenced to imprisonment in a labor camp for dissident activity. While there she continues to write poetry clandestinely.
June 2 – The Francophone Senegalese poet and politician Léopold Sédar Senghor becomes the first black African writer elected as a member of the Académie française.
July – Barbara Cartland, who reaches the age of 82, writes 23 romantic novels this year.
November – Bruce Bethke's short story Cyberpunk, written in 1980, is published in Amazing Stories magazine in the United States and as a novel online, giving a name to the entire science fiction subgenre of cyberpunk.
unknown date – Salvage for the Saint by Peter Bloxsom and John Kruse is published, as the final book in a series of novels, novellas and short stories featuring the Leslie Charteris creation "The Saint", which started in 1928. (An attempt to revive the series in 1997 is unsuccessful.)

New books

Fiction
Nelson Algren (posthumous) – The Devil's Stocking
Isaac Asimov – The Robots of Dawn
Greg Bear – The Wind from a Burning Woman
Samuel Beckett – Worstward Ho
Thomas Berger – The Feud
Thomas Bernhard – The Loser (Der Untergeher)
Jorge Luis Borges – Shakespeare's Memory (La memoria de Shakespeare, short stories)
Marion Zimmer Bradley – The Mists of Avalon
Morley Callaghan – A Time for Judas
Raymond Carver – Cathedral
Sandra Cisneros – The House on Mango Street
Hugo Claus – The Sorrow of Belgium (Het verdriet van België)
J. M. Coetzee – Life and Times of Michael K
Jackie Collins – Hollywood Wives
Basil Copper – The House of the Wolf
Bernard Cornwell
Sharpe's Sword
Sharpe's Enemy
Bernard and Judy Cornwell (as Susannah Kells) – A Crowning Glory
György Dalos – 1985
L. Sprague de Camp
The Reluctant King
The Unbeheaded King
Jim Dodge – Fup
Stephen R. Donaldson – White Gold Wielder: Book Three of The Second Chronicles of Thomas Covenant
Nora Ephron – Heartburn
Ken Follett – On Wings of Eagles
Ernest J. Gaines – A Gathering of Old Men
John Gardner – Icebreaker
Maarten 't Hart – De kroongetuige
Mark Helprin – Winter's Tale
Amado V. Hernandez – Luha ng Buwaya (Crocodile's Tear)
Susan Hill – The Woman in Black
Elfriede Jelinek – The Piano Teacher (Die Klavierspielerin)
Elizabeth Jolley – Woman in a Lamp Shade
Ernst Jünger – Aladdin's Problem
William Kennedy – Ironweed
Stephen King – Christine
Dean R. Koontz – Phantoms
Louis L'Amour – The Lonesome Gods
Derek Lambert – The Judas Code
John le Carré – The Little Drummer Girl
Mary Mackey – The Last Warrior Queen
Norman Mailer – Ancient Evenings
James A. Michener – Poland
R. K. Narayan – A Tiger for Malgudi
Robert B. Parker – The Widening Gyre
Ellis Peters
The Sanctuary Sparrow
The Devil's Novice
Tim Powers – The Anubis Gates
Terry Pratchett – The Colour of Magic
Salman Rushdie – Shame
Joanna Russ – The Zanzibar Cat
Danielle Steel – Changes
Walter Tevis – The Queen's Gambit
Gore Vidal – Duluth
Evangeline Walton – The Sword is Forged
Fay Weldon – The Life and Loves of a She-Devil
A. N. Wilson – Scandal
Robert Anton Wilson – Prometheus Rising
Christa Wolf – Cassandra (Kassandra)
Roger Zelazny – Unicorn Variations (stories and essays)

Children and young people
Chris Van Allsburg – The Wreck of the Zephyr
Jeanne-Marie Leprince de Beaumont (with Willi Glasauer) – Beauty and the Beast
Roald Dahl – The Witches
Lynley Dodd – Hairy Maclary from Donaldson's Dairy (first of the Hairy Maclary and Friends series)
Mem Fox – Possum Magic
Dick King-Smith – The Sheep-Pig (also as Babe, the Gallant Pig)
Harold Lamb (with George Barr and Alicia Austin) - The Sea of the Ravens
Astrid Lindgren – The Runaway Sleigh Ride! (Titta Madicken, det snöar!)
Jean Giono (with Willi Glasauer) – The Man Who Planted Trees

Drama
Samuel Beckett – Nacht und Träume (television play, first broadcast)
Ray Cooney – Run for Your Wife
David Mamet – Glengarry Glen Ross
Tom Murphy – The Gigli Concert
Christina Reid – Tea in a China Cup
Larry Shue – The Foreigner
Neil Simon – Brighton Beach Memoirs
Botho Strauß – The Park (Der Park)

Poetry
Paul Durcan – Jumping the Train Tracks with Angela
Grace Nichols – I is a long-memoried woman

Non-fiction
Benedict Anderson – Imagined Communities
Pascal Bruckner – The Tears of the White Man
L. Sprague de Camp – The Fringe of the Unknown
L. Sprague de Camp, Catherine Crook de Camp and Jane Whittington Griffin – Dark Valley Destiny
Tom Dardis – Harold Lloyd: The Man on the Clock
Terry Eagleton – Literary Theory: An Introduction
Anthony Grey – The Prime Minister Was a Spy
Shantabai Kamble – Majya Jalmachi Chittarkatha (The Kaleidoscopic Story of My Life)
Susan Oliver – Odyssey: A Daring Transatlantic Journey
Renée Richards – Second Serve: The Renée Richards Story
Anna Rosmus – Widerstand und Verfolgung am Beispiel Passau 1933–1945 (Resistance and Persecution – The Case of Passau 1933–1945)
Nawal El Saadawi – Mudhakkirâtî fî sijn an-nisâʾ (Memoirs from the Women's Prison)
Colin Thubron – Among the Russians
Julia Urquidi – Lo que Varguitas no dijo (What Little Vargas Did not Say)
A. N. Wilson – The Life of John Milton: A Biography

Births
July 2 – Tao Lin (林韬), Chinese novelist and poet
November 17 – Christopher Paolini, American fantasy novelist
December 6 – Jason Reynolds, African American children's novelist and poet
unknown date – Sarah Howe, Hong Kong-born poet writing in English

Deaths
January 5 – Chapman Grant, American historian and publisher (born 1887)
February 14 – Brita von Horn, Swedish theater director, dramatist and novelist (born 1886)
February 25 – Tennessee Williams (Thomas Lanier Williams III), American playwright (born 1911)
March 3 – Hergé (Georges Prosper Remi), Belgian comics creator (born 1907)
March 15 – Dame Rebecca West, British writer (born 1892)
April 12 – Desmond Bagley, English novelist (complications from stroke, born 1923))
May 4 – Shūji Terayama (寺山 修司), Japanese poet, dramatist, and film director (cirrhosis, born 1935)
May 21 – Amal Abul-Qassem Donqol, Egyptian poet (born 1940)
June 19 – Vilmundur Gylfason, Icelandic historian, poet and politician (suicide, born 1948)
June 27 – Alden Nowlan, Canadian poet, novelist and playwright (born 1933)
August 12 – Mikey Smith, Jamaican dub poet (stoned to death; born 1954)
August 18 – Sir Nikolaus Pevsner, German-born British art historian (born 1902)
September 16 – Roy Andries De Groot, English-born American food writer (born 1910)
December 5 – John Robinson, English religious writer and bishop (born 1919)

Awards
Nobel Prize for Literature: William Golding

Australia
The Australian/Vogel Literary Award: Jenny Summerville, Shields Of Trell
Kenneth Slessor Prize for Poetry: Vivian Smith, Tide Country
Miles Franklin Award: No award presented

Canada
See 1983 Governor General's Awards for a complete list of winners and finalists for those awards.

France
Prix Goncourt: Frédérick Tristan, Les Égarés
Prix Médicis French: Jean Echenoz, Cherokee
Prix Médicis International: Kenneth White, La Route bleue

Spain
Miguel de Cervantes Prize: Rafael Alberti

United Kingdom
Booker Prize: J. M. Coetzee -Life and Times of Michael K
Carnegie Medal for children's literature: Jan Mark, Handles
Cholmondeley Award: John Fuller, Craig Raine, Anthony Thwaite
Eric Gregory Award: Martin Stokes, Hilary Davies, Michael O'Neill, Lisa St Aubin De Teran, Deidre Shanahan
James Tait Black Memorial Prize for fiction: Jonathan Keates, Allegro Postillions
James Tait Black Memorial Prize for biography: Alan Walker, Franz Liszt: The Virtuoso Years
Newdigate prize: Peter McDonald
Whitbread Best Book Award: John Fuller, Flying to Nowhere

United States
Agnes Lynch Starrett Poetry Prize: Kate Daniels, The White Wave
Nebula Award: David Brin, Startide Rising
Newbery Medal for children's literature: Cynthia Voigt, Dicey's Song
Pulitzer Prize for Drama: Marsha Norman, 'Night, Mother
Pulitzer Prize for Fiction: Alice Walker – The Color Purple
Pulitzer Prize for Poetry: Galway Kinnell – Selected Poems
Pulitzer Prize for History: The Transformation of Virginia, 1740–1790 by Rhys Isaac
Pulitzer Prize for General Non-Fiction: Is There No Place on Earth for Me? by Susan Sheehan

Elsewhere
Hugo Award for Best Novel: Foundation's Edge by Isaac Asimov
Premio Nadal: Salvador García Aguilar, Regocijo en el hombre

References

 
Years of the 20th century in literature